Ma Yiming (born December 19, 1980) is a Chinese professional boxer and the former WBO China Zone flyweight and WBO Asia Pacific light flyweight champion.

Professional career

Ma debuted at the age of 26 in 2007 and lost five out of the first eight fights of his career. He won the vacant WBO China Zone flyweight title in his seventh fight. He would vacate and win this title again in 2010 against Mating Kilakil at the beginning of his winning streak, defending it a further three times.

In his ninth straight victory in 2014 against veteran Tommy Seran, Ma won the vacant WBO Asia Pacific light flyweight championship via a wide unanimous decision, closing his winning streak.

On April 24, 2015 Ma unsuccessfully challenged WBA light flyweight interim champion Randy Petalcorin, suffering three knockdowns en route to a first round technical knockout loss, ending his winning streak.

See also
Boxing in China

References

External links

|-

|-

Living people
1980 births
Chinese male boxers
Flyweight boxers
Southpaw boxers
Sportspeople from Dalian